St Luke's University may refer to:
St. Luke's International University, formerly St. Luke's College of Nursing, a private university in Tokyo, Japan
St. Luke's College of Nursing, Trinity University of Asia, in the Philippines
St Luke's Campus of the University of Exeter, England
St Luke's University, a fictional university in Bristol, England, in the Doctor Who UK tv series

See also
St. Luke's University Health Network, group of hospitals in Pennsylvania, United States